Antonio De Carlo (born August 4, 1967, in Tijuana, Baja California, Mexico), also known simply as Antonio, is a Mexican actor. He won an Emmy Award in 2005–2006. He is president and founder of the "Fundación Cultura Sin Fronteras AC". After twelve years out of show business, in 2012 he returned to the soap operas performing "Magic Dragon" one of the main characters for Miss XV, a co-production from Televisa México and Nickelodeon directed and produced by Pedro Damian. He is also part of the cast of Muchacha Italiana Viene a Casarse, directed by Pedro Damian (Televisa, México).

Education
In 1988 De Carlo received a B.A. degree in music from the Mexican National Music Conservatory. He was a member of the Teacher's Bar of Graduates in México City between 1995 and 1997. He also collaborated with the Foundation of Social Investigations FISAC between 1998 and 1999.

Awards
He has received several awards including the Golden Sun (Sol de Oro), the Golden Palms (Palmas de Oro), given by the Mexican National Circle of Journalists. He was awarded the Spanish Golden Laurel (Laurel de Oro) by the Same Out Group and the national award for public speaking in 1997 by Miguel Cornejo y Rosado. He is also included in the walk of fame in Tijuana's International Airport. On February 14, 2003 the Mayor of Tijuana, Jesus Gonzalez Reyes, gave him the Keys to the City of Tijuana.

De Carlo won his Emmy Award in 2005–2006 as Hispanic News Anchor in the category of "Informational/Public Affairs Series" and in the same year founded the Academia De Artes Antonio De Carlo (Hispanic Academy of Arts) in Los Angeles, California.

On July 14, 2008, the City Council of the City of Lynwood, California, distinguished Antonio with a proclamation in recognition of his outstanding career in the field of communications, as a professional television anchor and director, writer and producer of many theatre plays, actor of many soap operas produced by Televisa México and Singer, winner of three platinum records and seven gold records.

Soap operas

 Las 5 Mejores (2019 to date)... Producer and Director for TLNovelas Channel
 Despertar contigo (2016)... Rogelio
 Muchacha Italiana Viene a Casarse (2014)... Zacarias
 Miss XV (2012)... Aristides "Magic Dragon"
 Catalina y Sebastián (1999)... Padre Jerónimo
 La Usurpadora (1998)... Osvaldo Reséndiz
 Marisol (1996)... Rosendo
 Pobre niña rica (1995)... César Manzanillo
 Imperio de cristal (1994)... Bruno Previdi
 La pícara soñadora (1991)... Santiago Garrido
 Mi pequeña Soledad (1990)... José Luis Garza

TV series
 Miss XV (2012)... Aristides "Magic Dragon"
 Siempre en Domingo (1988–1991)... His Self "Antonio De Carlo" (Antonio/Singer)

Movies
 Alas de Mariposa (1992)... "Dustman"
 Verano Peligroso (1991)... "Lisandro Galante"

References

External links
Antonio De Carlo

Fundación Cultura Sin Fronteras AC
Antonio De Carlo at Alma Latina.net

1967 births
Living people
Male actors from Baja California
People from Tijuana
Mexican people of Italian descent
Mexican male film actors
Mexican male telenovela actors
Mexican male television actors